Kyung-sun, also spelled Kyung-seon or Kyong-son, is a Korean unisex given name. Its meaning differs based on the hanja used to write each syllable of the name. There are 54 hanja with the reading "kyung" and 41 hanja with the reading "sun" on the South Korean government's official list of hanja which may be used in given names. 

People with this name include:
Hong Kyong-son (born 1925), one of South Korea's unconverted long-term prisoners who was resettled to North Korea in 2000
Shin Kyung-sun (born 1933), South Korean male taekwondo practitioner
Suh Kyungsun (born 1942), South Korean female composer
Noh Kyung-sun (born 1964), South Korean male wrestler
Jin Kyung-sun (born 1980), South Korean male football player
Hwang Kyung-seon (born 1986), South Korean female taekwondo practitioner

See also
List of Korean given names

References

Korean unisex given names